Mount Hermon can refer to:
Mount Hermon, Alamance County, North Carolina
Mount Hermon, Pasquotank County, North Carolina

See also:
Mount Herman, North Carolina